The Gloucester Griffins are a Junior "B" box lacrosse team from Gloucester, Ontario, Canada.  The Griffins play in the OLA Junior B Lacrosse League.

History
The Griffins were founded in 1978 as a Junior "B" lacrosse team and became and incorporated non-for-profit business in 1992.  A couple times, due to the team nearness to the Quebec border, the Griffins have jumped leagues.  The Griffs played in Quebec in 1979 and 1980, and then again in 1988 and 1989.  The Griffins have been a constant fixture in the OLA-B since 1990.  In 1989, the Griffins hosted the Founders Cup, the National Championships, on behalf of the Ligue de Crosse Junior du Québec and again they hosted it in 1991 for the OLA-B.  As Quebec Provincial Champions in 1988 and 1989, they also earned their way to the tournament twice, for a total of three National Championship appearances.

Since re-entering the OLA-B, the Griffins had 5 strong seasons, but only got past the quarter-finals in the playoffs once.  Since 1994, the sky has come crashing down for the Griffins.  Once a powerhouse in Eastern Ontario lacrosse, the Griffins have suffered 12 straight losing seasons.  The bottom fell out in 2005, with the Griffins completing an entirely winless season.  The 0-20-0 Griffins averaged a 17.50 goals against average.

The team has since rebuilt and won the Far East title in 2009 with a 12-8-0 record thanks to a Grant Schubert overtime winner in the final game of the year against Kahnawake.

Season-by-season results
Note: GP = Games played, W = Wins, L = Losses, T = Ties, Pts = Points, GF = Goals for, GA = Goals against

References

External links
Griffins Webpage
Griffins Team History
Gloucester Lacrosse Association (Minor)
The Bible of Lacrosse
Unofficial OLA Page

Ontario Lacrosse Association teams
Lacrosse teams in Ottawa